Fernando Jose is a masculine given name. Notable people with the name include:

Fernando José de França Dias Van-Dúnem (born 1934), Angolan politician
Fernando José Torres Sanz, Fernando Torres

Portuguese masculine given names
Spanish masculine given names